Oak Mountain is a summit located in Central New York Region of New York located in the Town of Salisbury in Herkimer County, northwest of Stratford.

References

Mountains of Herkimer County, New York
Mountains of New York (state)